The Union Traction Company was a trolley line that ran from Hackensack through Carlstadt to Rutherford, New Jersey. The line was conceived by Delos E. Culver. Originally the line was to run from Hackensack to Kearny, New Jersey but the company became insolvent and was merged into other trolley lines before the line could be fully built.

See also
List of New Jersey street railroads

References

Light rail in New Jersey
Defunct New Jersey railroads
New Jersey streetcar lines
Defunct public transport operators in the United States
Tram, urban railway and trolley companies
Rutherford, New Jersey